is a public high school located in Komae, Tokyo, Japan. There are over 2000 male and female students at Komae from grades 10 to 12. The school was established on April 1, 1972. Komae High is a sister school of Kirrawee High School, located in Sydney, Australia. It is overseen by the Tokyo Metropolitan Government Board of Education.

Access 
The school is located approximately 3 minutes walk from Izumi-Tamagawa Station on the Odakyū Odawara Line.

Notable alumni 
 Hajime Mizoguchi, cellist

References

High schools in Tokyo
Educational institutions established in 1972
Komae, Tokyo